The 2010 term of the Supreme Court of the United States began October 4, 2010, and concluded October 1, 2011. The table illustrates which opinion was filed by each justice in each case and which justices joined each opinion.

Table key

2010 term opinions

2010 term membership and statistics
This was the sixth term of Chief Justice Roberts' tenure, and the first term for Justice Kagan.

Notes

References

 

Lists of United States Supreme Court opinions by term